Tarsky District is an administrative and municipal district (raion), one of the thirty-two in Omsk Oblast, Russia. It is located in the northeast of the oblast. Its administrative center is the town of Tara (which is not administratively a part of the district). Population: 19,242 (2010 Census);

Administrative and municipal status
Within the framework of administrative divisions, Tarsky District is one of the thirty-two in the oblast. The town of Tara serves as its administrative center, despite being incorporated separately as a town of oblast significance—an administrative unit with the status equal to that of the districts (and which, in addition to Tara, also includes two rural localities).

As a municipal division, the district is incorporated as Tarsky Municipal District, with the town of oblast significance of Tara being incorporated within it as Tara Urban Settlement.

References

Notes

Sources

Districts of Omsk Oblast

